Não Para Não (English: Don't Stop) is the second studio album by Brazilian singer, songwriter and drag queen Pabllo Vittar, released on October 4, 2018, through Sony Music Brasil. The album features Urias, Dilsinho and Ludmilla. The first single is "Problema Seu", released on August 15, 2018.

It features various Brazilian rhythms such as forró, tecnobrega, axé, among others just like Vittar's debut album.

It was ranked as the 5th best Brazilian album of 2018 by the Brazilian edition of Rolling Stone magazine and among the 25 best Brazilian albums of the second half of 2018 by the São Paulo Association of Art Critics.

Concept 
On the cover of the album, Vittar is presented as a "goddess of technology", according to the artist herself. The image is a "modern deity that attracts and unifies rhythms, ideas, cultures and languages of a rich and multifaceted Brazil."

Singles 
The first single, "Problema Seu", was accompanied by a 2D-8 bit game, where guest appearances by Urias, Dilsinho and Ludmilla on the album were revealed. The singer revealed the title and the cover one week before the release, during her participation at the 2018 Multishow Awards.

The second single, "Disk Me", was released one day after the album's release. The music video contained a phone number, displayed on a cell phone in one of the opening scenes. By contacting this number, one could receive different messages from Vittar, depending on the medium of contact; by voice, or via WhatsApp.

Commercial performance 
In less than two hours after its release, "Não Para Não" debuted at the top of Brazilian iTunes. The album debuted on Spotify Brazil with 3,132,633 streams, being the best debut by an album on the platform in 2018, surpassing albums by foreign artists such as Camila Cabello. In addition to this feat, all the tracks of the album debuted in the top 40 and top 50 of Spotify and Apple Music, respectively. "Não Para Não" became the only Brazilian album to chart all its tracks on Spotify's most listened list.

Track listing 
All tracks produced by Brabo Music Team and Nikolić, except "Miragem" (produced by Brabo and Junior Fernandes) and "Problema Seu" (produced also by Noize Men).

Release history

Certifications

Não Para Não Tour

The Não Para Não Tour  is an ongoing headlining concert tour by Brazilian singer Pabllo Vittar, in support of her second studio album, Não Para Não (2018). The tour began on November 1, 2018, in São Paulo at Cine Joia.

Set list

Shows

References 

2018 albums
Pabllo Vittar albums